Stephen Jesse Jackson (born April 5, 1978) is an American former professional basketball player who played 14 seasons in the National Basketball Association (NBA) with the New Jersey Nets, Atlanta Hawks, Indiana Pacers, Golden State Warriors, Milwaukee Bucks, Charlotte Bobcats, San Antonio Spurs, and Los Angeles Clippers. Jackson won an NBA championship with the Spurs in 2003. Jackson has emerged as a  visible activist and spokesman for civil rights during the Black Lives Matter movement.

Early life
Jackson was born in Houston, Texas, and spent his childhood in Port Arthur, Texas.  Growing up, Jackson was raised by his mother, Judyette, a single parent who worked two jobs. As a teenager, Jackson worked in his grandfather's soul food restaurant in Port Arthur, where he would wash dishes and bus tables. At the age of 16, Jackson's half-brother Donald Buckner died at 25 years old from head injuries after being jumped. Following the violent tragedy, Jackson said that he wished he could have been there to assist and protect a member of his family. "You can't tell me seeing his brother die that way hasn't had an effect," recalls Pacers CEO Donnie Walsh. "To me, it's why he is always coming to the help of his teammates."

Jackson led Lincoln High School to a state championship in his junior year. However, facing academic ineligibility at Lincoln, he transferred to Oak Hill Academy (Virginia), where he earned All-American honors in 1996. He was the leading scorer in the 1996 McDonald's All-American Boys Game, on a team that included Kobe Bryant, Jermaine O'Neal and Tim Thomas.

Following a commitment to join the University of Arizona, Jackson was ruled academically ineligible due to his low SAT and ACT test scores. He instead attended Butler County Community College of El Dorado, Kansas for one semester, but did not play basketball there. Prior to the 1997 NBA Draft, Jackson participated in several pickup games with the Phoenix Suns after family friend and fellow Arizona native Virginia Bibby (mother of NBA player Mike Bibby) brought him to the Suns arena during tryouts. Jackson's strong play, specifically his fearlessness against the Suns Cedric Ceballos, is largely what led to team president Danny Ainge drafting him months later.

Professional career

CBA and foreign leagues (1997–2000)
Jackson was selected 42nd overall in the 1997 NBA Draft by the Phoenix Suns, yet did not play as he was waived by the team on October 30. Following this development, Jackson then saw action in six games with the La Crosse Bobcats over two on-and-off seasons in the Continental Basketball Association (CBA), in which he averaged 2.7 points in 12.7 minutes per game. Additionally, Jackson played four games in 1998 with the Sydney Kings in Australia's National Basketball League. Continuing his basketball journey, Jackson played professionally in Venezuela and the Dominican Republic. Throughout the spring and summer of 2000, Jackson played in those Latin American countries, with the Dominican Republic teams San Carlos and Pueblo Nuevo and Venezuelan Marinos. In the 1999 season in Venezuela, Jackson played 48 games and averaged 22.8 points (third in the league), 3.9 assists and 3 steals per game, shooting 42.6% from three (second in the league).

New Jersey Nets (2000–2001)
Jackson did not play an NBA game until the 2000–01 season with the New Jersey Nets, officially deemed his rookie season. He appeared in 77 games (including 40 starts), in which he averaged 8.2 points per game, and established a close friendship with star point guard Stephon Marbury. The Nets did not have interest in retaining him.

San Antonio Spurs (2001–2003)
Before the 2001–2002 NBA season, he was signed by the San Antonio Spurs. Following a somewhat successful rookie campaign, Jackson was hampered by injuries and team expectations in 2001, missing a total of 45 games. Former assistant coach Mike Brown stated: "The first year we had him in San Antonio, he was on the (injured reserve) most of the year. At first, he didn't understand why because he probably was the most talented player we had on that team, but he needed to mature a little bit so we stuck him there to see how he would respond. He was the best teammate on our team that first year. He was juiced at practice ready to play and compete and make the starters better, and it carried over into his second year when he got his opportunity to get out onto the floor and prove he could be a vital part of the organization." His season averages were 3.9 points and 1.1 rebounds, logging approximately 9.9 minutes per game. During the 2002–2003 NBA season, Jackson became a key member of the Spurs. Appearing in 80 games (58 starts), his season averages were 11.8 points, 3.6 rebounds and 2.3 assists in 28.2 minutes per game. During the team's run in the 2003 NBA Playoffs, Jackson proved to be a vital asset and helped the Spurs win their second NBA title, averaging 12.8 points per game during the playoffs –- the team's 3rd leading scorer. Jackson's first foray into the playoffs produced variable results in terms of individual performances. Through the course of the postseason, Jackson vacillated between fourth quarter heroics and clutch shooting (elimination games of the Western Conference Finals versus the Dallas Mavericks and NBA Finals versus the New Jersey Nets) and uneven, mistake-prone play (26 turnovers in the 6-game championship series).

Atlanta Hawks (2003–2004)
In 2003, Jackson became a free agent during the offseason and expected to parlay his success with the Spurs into a long-term contract. After rejecting an initial offer by the Spurs, he and his agent were criticized by sports media for miscalculating the market. Eventually, Jackson agreed to a 2-year contract with the Atlanta Hawks.  Registering his best professional season to date, Jackson established season averages of 18.1 points, 4.6 rebounds and 3.1 assists per game in 80 total games (78 starts). On March 12, against the Washington Wizards, Jackson scored a career-best 42 points. In the 29 games following the All-Star Break, Jackson averaged 24.0 points, 5.5 rebounds, 3.5 assists, and 2.2 steals per game. During this stretch, he was the NBA's 6th leading scorer.

Following the 2003–04 NBA season, he was traded to the Indiana Pacers for power forward Al Harrington (who finished 2nd place in Sixth Man of the Year voting), after signing a 6-year, $38.3 million contract.

Indiana Pacers (2004–2007)

During his first season as a member of the Indiana Pacers in the 2004–05 NBA season, Jackson tallied averages of 18.7 points, 4.9 rebounds, and 2.3 assists per game.

On November 19, 2004, during The Malice at the Palace, Jackson was involved in a brawl with fans in the stands at The Palace of Auburn Hills. In the aftermath, Jackson was suspended for 30 games without pay, thereby losing $1.7 million in salary. He was also put on probation for a year, fined $250, and ordered to undergo anger management classes and perform 60 hours of community service. After he failed to complete the terms of the sentence he received, his probation was extended one year.

Indiana's once promising post-season possibilities were marred by the suspension of starting small forward Ron Artest. Jackson averaged 18.9 points per game during the first round of the 2005 NBA Playoffs versus the Boston Celtics. A series loss in the next round at the hands of the Detroit Pistons ended their season, with Jackson leading the team in scoring during the playoffs with an average of 16.1 points per game.

In the 2005–06 NBA season, Jackson appeared in 81 games for the Pacers, averaging 16.4 points, 3.9 rebounds, and 2.8 assists per game. A notable exhibition of Jackson's scoring ability came during a 31-point performance in a midseason victory over the Sacramento Kings, in which he made 3-pointers on four consecutive possessions. Jackson tied the Kings franchise record for the most 3-pointers in a quarter by an opponent.  As the playoff push ensued, he tallied an average of 20.2 points per game in the month of April.

On October 6, 2006, Jackson and three other Pacers players had an argument with several patrons at Club Rio, a strip club in Indianapolis. Jackson was punched by one of the patrons and was hit by a car, rolling onto the hood. His injuries were minor. Jackson, who was on probation in Michigan after pleading no contest to misdemeanor assault and battery charges there for his part in a brawl, fired several gunshots from a 9-mm pistol, he asserted as an act of self-defense. However, prosecutors later said he fired first. Jackson was charged October 11, 2006, with a felony count of criminal recklessness, and misdemeanor counts of battery and disorderly conduct. He pled guilty to a felony count of criminal recklessness, received one year of probation, and was ordered to pay a $5,000 fine and perform 100 hours of community service. Because he had no prior felony convictions, he was eligible to receive misdemeanor sentencing despite pleading guilty to the felony. He served a seven-game suspension at the beginning of the 2007–08 NBA season as a Warrior for his legal problems.

Golden State Warriors (2007–2009)

On January 17, 2007, the Pacers dealt Jackson to the Golden State Warriors in a blockbuster eight player trade. Along with Al Harrington, Šarūnas Jasikevičius, and Josh Powell, Jackson was swapped for Mike Dunleavy, Troy Murphy, Ike Diogu, and Keith McLeod of the Warriors.

Jackson registered 29 points, 7 rebounds, 4 assists, and 5 steals in his Warriors debut, January 20, 2007 versus the Cleveland Cavaliers. On February 5, when Golden State traveled to Conseco Fieldhouse to compete against Jackson's former team, he tallied 36 points and led the Warriors to a 113–98 victory over the Indiana Pacers. Jackson joined Vince Carter and Dominique Wilkins as the only players in 25 years to amass 30 or more points against a team that they played for earlier in the season.

In the Warriors 4–2 series victory over the Dallas Mavericks in the first round of the 2007 NBA Playoffs, Jackson garnered both positive and negative publicity. In what some consider the biggest upset in NBA history, Jackson was ejected from Games 2 and 5. The latter decision, in Game 5, was heavily criticized as Jackson appeared to be merely applauding at the end of the game to lift the spirits of his teammates, and not sarcastically at a referee. However, Jackson redeemed himself by playing well the entire series, especially in the series-clinching Game 6, where Jackson tallied 33 points on a then franchise playoff-record 7 three-pointers. This team playoff record has since been matched or exceeded 25 times by Stephen Curry and Klay Thompson.

Baron Davis, who suffered a slight hamstring injury in the 1st quarter of Game 6, shares his thoughts regarding Jackson: "I told him (Stephen Jackson) I'll give it all I got and I didn't want to be the hardest worker out there. He had to carry me. He is the leader of this team and if you ask anyone on this team, he is the heart and soul of this team. He is a big-game performer and he knew just how important this game was. He is the only one on our team to have won a championship, so we had to feed off of him."

Jackson finished the series with per-game averages of 22.8 points, 4.5 rebounds, 3.7 assists, and 2.0 steals. In the Conference Semifinals, the Warriors were dispatched by a physical Utah Jazz team in 5 games. Jackson struggled due to the defensive tandem of Andrei Kirilenko and Matt Harpring and his offensive output decreased from the previous series.

Prior to the 2007–08 NBA season, Jackson (along with guard Baron Davis and forward Matt Barnes) was named a team captain of the Warriors. Jackson was the recipient of the NBA's Western Conference Player of the Week award (November 26 – December 2), averaging 23.0 points, 5.5 rebounds, 3.8 assists, and 2.8 steals. Despite winning 48 games, the Warriors missed the playoffs in a Western Conference where all eight playoff teams won at least 50 games (Their 48 wins are the most of a team that did not qualify for playoffs in NBA history).

During the 2008–09 NBA season, Jackson registered three games of at least 30 points and 10 assists in a five-game span – the first NBA player to do so since LeBron James in 2007, and the first member of the Warriors since Tim Hardaway in 1992. He also tallied his first career triple double (30 points, 11 rebounds, 10 assists) against the Phoenix Suns in the midst of this stretch, on February 4. On November 17, 2008, Jackson signed a three-year contract extension with the Warriors.

Jackson's 2008–09 campaign effectively ended when he decided to determine the root cause of turf toe on his left foot, which had been ailing him for over 2 years. He underwent surgery on March 31, 2009, to remove multiple bone spurs above the nerve tissue under his big toe. His per-game season averages were 20.7 points, 5.1 rebounds, 6.5 assists (2nd only to LeBron James for forwards), 1.5 steals, and 39.6 minutes (2nd in the league, trailing only Joe Johnson of the Atlanta Hawks).

Charlotte Bobcats (2009–2011)
On November 16, 2009, Jackson was traded to the Charlotte Bobcats along with Acie Law in exchange for Raja Bell and Vladimir Radmanović. Jackson set a Bobcats franchise record with 43 points scored versus the Houston Rockets, on January 12, 2010. The NBA recognized Jackson as the Eastern Conference's Player of the Week on January 17, after he averaged 29.3 points, 6.7 rebounds, 4.7 assists and 3.3 steals. In tandem with forward Gerald Wallace, Jackson led the Bobcats to the franchise's first playoff appearance (culminating in a 4–0 series loss at the hands of the Orlando Magic). In league MVP voting, Jackson finished in 12th place, tied with Chris Bosh, Joe Johnson, and Chauncey Billups.

In the 2010-11 NBA season, Jackson recorded the first triple double (24 points, 10 rebounds, and 10 assists) in Bobcats team history versus the Phoenix Suns on November 20, 2010. However, Jackson failed to lead the Bobcats to the playoffs in 2011 and expressed disappointment with the team following a midseason trade of Gerald Wallace.

Milwaukee Bucks (2011–2012)
On June 23, 2011, after only two seasons with the Charlotte Bobcats, Jackson was traded to the Milwaukee Bucks as part of a three-way deal with the Sacramento Kings and Charlotte Bobcats. As part of the terms, the Milwaukee Bucks received Jackson, Shaun Livingston, the rights to the 19th overall pick in the 2011 NBA Draft, Tobias Harris from Charlotte, and Beno Udrih from Sacramento. Charlotte received Corey Maggette from Milwaukee and the rights to the 7th overall pick in the 2011 NBA Draft, Bismack Biyombo, from Sacramento. Sacramento received John Salmons from Milwaukee and the rights to Jimmer Fredette, the 10th overall pick in the 2011 NBA Draft.

Jackson's brief stint with Milwaukee would be characterized by dysfunction and underwhelming play. Due to recurring issues with his hamstring throughout the lockout-extended offseason  and several publicized clashes with coach Scott Skiles, Jackson's role and playing time diminished. On March 13, 2012, Jackson was traded back to the Golden State Warriors along with Andrew Bogut, in exchange for Monta Ellis, Ekpe Udoh, and Kwame Brown.

Return to San Antonio (2012–2013)
Without playing a game for the Warriors, Jackson was traded to the Spurs for Richard Jefferson, T.J. Ford and a conditional first round pick on March 15, 2012. Due to the ascendant performance of rookie forward Kawhi Leonard, Jackson was a second-unit player for the first time in nearly 10 years. A re-adjustment period to San Antonio's structured offensive system caused Jackson's minutes to fluctuate in the regular season and playoffs.

The Spurs capped off an excellent regular season by reaching the Western Conference Playoffs as the highest seed. Ultimately, San Antonio lost 4 games to 2 to the Oklahoma City Thunder in the Western Conference Finals. Jackson drew praise for his defensive efforts against league scoring champion Kevin Durant. In the elimination game of the series, Jackson connected on his first 6 three-point attempts. For the playoffs, Jackson shot 53.5% from the field, 60.5% from three-point range, and 93.3% from the free throw line.

On December 9, 2012, Jackson was fined $25,000 for threatening Serge Ibaka via Twitter. "The recent public comments made by Stephen Jackson are absolutely unacceptable, cannot be tolerated, and do not reflect the standards held by the San Antonio Spurs," said Spurs general manager R.C. Buford.

On April 12, 2013, Jackson was waived by the Spurs.

Los Angeles Clippers (2013–2014)

On December 10, 2013, he signed with the Los Angeles Clippers. Jackson struggled with the Clippers. In 9 games, he averaged a career-low 1.7 points per game, while shooting 23.1% from the field and 7.1% from three-point range. On January 7, 2014, he was waived by the Clippers.

Retirement
On July 22, 2015, Jackson announced his retirement. During his 14-year NBA career, Jackson earned more than $68.6 million in salary (excluding his stint with the Clippers in which his contract was not guaranteed).

BIG3
In 2017, Jackson joined the BIG3 basketball league, playing alongside Chauncey Billups and head coach Charles Oakley with the Killer 3s.

In 2021, he was named head coach of Trilogy, and has led the team to back-to-back BIG3 Championships (2021–22).

Accomplishments 
 2x BIG3 Champion (2021, 2022)
 Trash Talker Of The Year (2021)
 Coach Of The Year (2021)

Podcasting career
Jackson is currently host for the digital video podcast All the Smoke with Matt Barnes and Stephen Jackson. The video podcast is available on Showtime Basketball's YouTube platform and other audio outlets such as iTunes and Spotify.  The show has had guests such as Kevin Garnett, Paul Pierce, Snoop Dogg, Stephen Curry, Lou Williams, J. R. Smith, Dwyane Wade, Kevin Durant, DeMarcus Cousins, Stephen A. Smith, Al Harrington, Shannon Sharpe, Chris Paul, Lil Wayne, Draymond Green, Deion Sanders, Steve Nash, Shaquille O'Neal, and Kobe Bryant. The podcast had the last exclusive interview with Bryant before his death. The podcast is produced by Malka Media and Showtime Networks.

NBA career statistics

Regular season

|-
| align="left" | 
| align="left" | New Jersey
| 77 || 40 || 21.6 || .425 || .335 || .719 || 2.7 || 1.8 || 1.1 || .2 || 8.2
|-
| align="left" | 
| align="left" | San Antonio
| 23 || 1 || 9.9 || .374 || .250 || .706 || 1.1 || .5 || .7 || .1 || 3.9
|-
| style="text-align:left; background:#afe6ba;"| 
| align="left" | San Antonio
| 80 || 58 || 28.2 || .435 || .320 || .760 || 3.6 || 2.3 || 1.6 || .4 || 11.8
|-
| align="left" | 
| align="left" | Atlanta
| 80 || 78 || 36.8 || .425 || .340 || .785 || 4.6 || 3.1 || 1.8 || .3 || 18.1
|-
| align="left" | 
| align="left" | Indiana
| 51 || 49 || 35.4 || .403 || .360 || .830 || 4.9 || 2.3 || 1.3 || .3 || 18.7
|-
| align="left" | 
| align="left" | Indiana
| 81 || 81 || 35.9 || .411 || .345 || .786 || 3.9 || 2.8 || 1.3 || .5 || 16.4
|-
| align="left" | 
| align="left" | Indiana
| 37 || 32 || 32.1 || .419 || .297 || .822 || 2.6 || 3.1 || .9 || .5 || 14.1
|-
| align="left" | 
| align="left" | Golden State
| 38 || 37 || 34.0 || .446 || .341 || .804 || 3.3 || 4.6 || 1.3 || .4 || 16.8
|-
| align="left" | 
| align="left" | Golden State
| 73 || 73 || 39.1 || .405 || .363 || .832 || 4.4 || 4.1 || 1.3 || .4 || 20.1
|-
| align="left" | 
| align="left" | Golden State
| 59 || 59 || 39.6 || .414 || .338 || .826 || 5.1 || 6.5 || 1.5 || .5 || 20.7
|-
| align="left" | 
| align="left" | Golden State
| 9 || 9 || 33.3 || .421 || .275 || .703 || 3.9 || 4.7 || 1.6 || .7 || 16.6
|-
| align="left" | 
| align="left" | Charlotte
| 72 || 72 || 39.3 || .423 || .334 || .786 || 5.1 || 3.6 || 1.6 || .5 || 21.1
|-
| align="left" | 
| align="left" | Charlotte
| 67 || 67 || 35.9 || .411 || .337 || .816 || 4.5 || 3.6 || 1.2 || .4 || 18.5
|-
| align="left" | 
| align="left" | Milwaukee
| 26 || 13 || 27.4 || .357 || .278 || .833 || 3.2 || 3.0 || 1.0 || .2 || 10.5
|-
| align="left" | 
| align="left" | San Antonio
| 21 || 1 || 23.8 || .405 || .306 || .815 || 3.9 || 2.0 || 1.3 || .3 || 8.9
|-
| align="left" | 
| align="left" | San Antonio
| 55 || 6 || 19.5 || .373 || .271 || .700 || 2.8 || 1.5 || .7 || .3 || 6.2
|-
| align="left" | 
| align="left" | L.A. Clippers
| 9 || 0 || 11.9 || .231 || .071 || .500 || 1.1 || 0.6 || .7 || .1 || 1.7
|- class="sortbottom"
| style="text-align:center;" colspan="2"| Career
| 858 || 676 || 31.9 || .414 || .333 || .798 || 3.9 || 3.1 || 1.3 || .4 || 15.1

Playoffs

|-
|  style="text-align:left; background:#afe6ba;"| 2003†
| align="left" | San Antonio
| 24 || 24 || 33.8 || .414 || .336 || .803 || 4.1 || 2.7 || 1.4 || .4 || 12.8
|-
| align="left" | 2005
| align="left" | Indiana
| 13 || 13 || 36.3 || .393 || .317 || .817 || 3.8 || 2.2 || 1.9 || .5 || 16.1
|-
| align="left" | 2006
| align="left" | Indiana
| 6 || 6 || 37.8 || .366 || .231 || .778 || 4.5 || 3.3 || .7 || .2 || 13.3
|-
| align="left" | 2007
| align="left" | Golden State
| 11 || 11 || 41.3 || .379 || .361 || .816 || 3.6 || 3.6 || 2.0 || .7 || 19.9
|-
| align="left" | 2010
| align="left" | Charlotte
| 4 || 4 || 39.0 || .358 || .167 || .808 || 5.0 || 3.8 || 1.3 || .3 || 18.0
|-
| align="left" | 2012
| align="left" | San Antonio
| 14 || 0 || 21.4 || .535 || style="background:#cfecec;"|.605* || .933 || 2.0 || 1.7 || .6 || .2 || 8.3
|- class="sortbottom"
| style="text-align:center;" colspan="2"| Career
| 72 || 58 || 33.6 || .404 || .355 || .816 || 3.7 || 2.7 || 1.4 || .4 || 13.9

Player profile
Jackson was an NBA swingman who was known to be a somewhat streaky outside shooter, but with scoring range that extended from the basket to the 3-point line. Despite spurts of inefficient, turnover-prone play, Jackson proved a capable playmaking option, with above-average passing abilities and court vision.

Larry Brown, a member of the Basketball Hall of Fame and former head coach of the Charlotte Bobcats, readily acknowledged Jackson's ability: "You ask anyone in the league – Stephen is an elite player. He's as bright as anyone I've coached." Former Golden State Warriors head coach Don Nelson, the second most winning coach in NBA history, summarized Jackson's game: "I don't think that people realize how good a player Jackson is, he guards every night, he makes plays, he can shoot, and the only thing that he doesn't do is rebound. He makes everyone around him better." Jackson's coach during his Indiana days, Rick Carlisle, described Jackson as a "terrific all-around player... He's an experienced guy, strong and quick. He has a good understanding of the game on the defensive side of the ball." NBA legend and former Pacers president Larry Bird called Jackson the toughest player in the league, regarding injuries and subsequently playing through the pain. Bird also praised Jackson's ability to "do every aspect of the game at a high level."
Theo Ratliff, a former Bobcats teammate, asserted that "if he is not an All-Star in this league, I don't know who is. It is time people recognize what he does on the floor."

Tim Duncan once labeled Jackson as the "ultimate teammate" during Jackson's first stint in San Antonio. ESPN analyst and sportswriter Michael Smith finds Jackson to be "articulate, charming, and thoughtful."

Marcus Thompson of the Contra Costa Times conveys his opinion as such: "He takes the younger players under his wing, taking them shopping, dispensing advice, lending an ear. What's more, he does the little things that are unbecoming of a millionaire. He looks people in the eye when they talk to him, as if he cares about what they're saying. He frequently doles out handshakes, half-hugs and, to women, pecks on the cheek. He returns phone calls. He mends fences, lifts spirits, makes others feel special." Following a community outreach event, Gwen Knapp of the San Francisco Chronicle stated that "[Jackson] couldn't have been more charming or more engaged, the perfect face of the franchise."

Former coaches Rick Carlisle and Don Nelson have constantly referred to Jackson's high character. During an appearance on the Jim Rome radio show, Nelson alluded to Jackson in a laudatory manner beyond the limited scope of the NBA. Former Pacers executive Donnie Walsh, who was principally responsible for the Golden State trade, stated "I love Jack to death. He's emotional and he's going to get technicals. But that's just part of the package. He's a great team guy."

Personal life

Stemming from the two referenced incidents in 2004 and 2006, Jackson has pled guilty to felony criminal recklessness, and been charged with a number of misdemeanors, including assault, disorderly conduct, and two counts of battery.

On January 4, 2018, Jackson told TMZ, "I smoked my whole career, had a hell of a career. Didn't miss no games," when asked by a reporter if the NBA should remove marijuana from their banned substances list.

On July 7, 2020, Jackson defended Philadelphia Eagles wide receiver DeSean Jackson for posting an anti-Semitic post on Instagram, which included a quote falsely attributed to Adolf Hitler. After receiving criticism from Naismith Hall of Fame members such as Kareem Abdul-Jabbar and Charles Barkley, Jackson apologized for his comments, saying that he "used the wrong words".

On January 6, 2021, Jackson officially converted to Islam. Jackson stated in an interview that "I can honestly say that there is no one who loves Allah more than me." He also stated that "Everything I have today is because I get on my knees and pray five times a day. I wouldn’t be able to wake up, breathe, and provide for my child, if I didn’t get on my knees and worship Allah. Allah is the one in control, and each and every one of us in creation are reliant on Allah in each and every moment. It is only when we realize this that this inner peace descends upon us. And that’s what Islam is about–Salaam–that peace."

In December 2011, under the alias Stak5, Jackson released a rap mixtape entitled What's a Lockout?, hosted by DJ Scream of Maybach Music Group. The mixtape included guest appearances by various artists, including hip-hop rapper Scarface.

Imani Showalter, Jackson's ex-fiancée and mother of two of his children, was a cast member of the first season of Basketball Wives: LA, a reality show airing on American cable television network VH1.

Activism and charity
During his 7-game suspension to begin the 2007–08 NBA season, Jackson donated a significant portion of his time towards community service in the Oakland area, organizing several events geared mainly towards children. Additionally, during a game against the Toronto Raptors, Jackson paid tribute to forward Matt Barnes and his ailing mother whom he had left to support in her battle against cancer, by wearing the number 22 on his headband. Jackson also offered to miss his return from suspension if Barnes needed the support at home. Throughout his tenure in Golden State, Jackson attended Bible study with teammates such as Kelenna Azubuike, Al Harrington, and Brandan Wright. Pairing up with Southwest Airlines, Jackson and the Warriors organization arranged an essay contest for elementary school students from his hometown of Port Arthur, which gave 10 third-graders the opportunity to meet Jackson and receive tickets to the following night's game.

The NBA recognized Jackson for his ongoing charitable causes and presented him with the league's Community Assist Award for March 2008.  During the month, he participated in a Silence the Violence rally, teamed up with Grammy Award-winner John Legend to raise funds for the Show Me Campaign, participated in a groundbreaking for a basketball court, and launched his own foundation. In conjunction with the Good Tidings Foundation, Jackson unveiled the Stephen Jackson Basketball Court at Omega Boys Club in San Francisco, California on April 11, 2008. Additionally, in honor of Jackson's continued commitment to the Bay Area community, San Francisco Mayor Gavin Newsom proclaimed Saturday, April 12, 2008 – the day after the unveiling – as Stephen Jackson Day.

Jackson established the Stephen Jackson Academy of Art, Science, and Technology in the summer of 2008.  New construction for the school was completed in 2009; as of 2012, the academy offers after-school programs for local children and houses a gymnasium for public use. In order to pursue educational accreditation, Jackson plans to expand the academy. According to The Port Arthur News, new construction will likely commence by the end of 2012.

Jackson was a close friend of George Floyd, who drew international attention when he was killed by police in Minneapolis on May 25, 2020. Jackson received media attention for an impassioned speech he gave at a protest rally in Minnesota. In it, he stated, "I'm here because they're not gonna demean the character of George Floyd, my twin." Jackson and Floyd called each other "Twin" due to their similar physical appearance.

Jackson described himself as inspired by Malcolm X, who is described as "the biggest reason for the continuation of Islam in the African-American community." Jackson stated, "Every black man is influenced by Malcolm X. When you are growing up and hear the story of Malcolm X, you are influenced by Malcolm X, and by Islam, in some type of way. For me, I am of course influenced by Malcolm X. It is impossible for me not to be...I do not see myself just following him. I want to be greater than Malcolm X. Even when I say that, it might be damn near impossible, because the man was so special. Malcolm X was so special. I strive to be like him or even better than him. And for you to say that he is the most respected American Muslim ever, I strive to be that. I plan to be that."

References

External links

Jackson's official website

1978 births
Living people
21st-century American rappers
African-American basketball players
African-American male rappers
American expatriate basketball people in Australia
American expatriate basketball people in the Dominican Republic
American expatriate basketball people in Venezuela
American men's basketball players
Atlanta Hawks players
Basketball players from Houston
Big3 players
Butler Grizzlies men's basketball players
Charlotte Bobcats players
Fort Wayne Fury players
Fox Sports 1 people
Golden State Warriors players
Indiana Pacers players
La Crosse Bobcats players
Los Angeles Clippers players
McDonald's High School All-Americans
Milwaukee Bucks players
New Jersey Nets players
Parade High School All-Americans (boys' basketball)
Phoenix Suns draft picks
San Antonio Spurs players
Shooting guards
Small forwards
Sportspeople from Port Arthur, Texas
Sydney Kings players
21st-century American male musicians
Converts to Islam
African-American Muslims
21st-century Muslims
21st-century African-American musicians
20th-century African-American sportspeople
American men's 3x3 basketball players